Where Do We Go from Here is the third album by Christian rock band Pillar. The song "Bring Me Down" was featured on the 2005 Major League Baseball video game, MLB 2006, as well as the offroad racing game MX vs. ATV Unleashed. The songs "Frontline" and "Bring Me Down" reached No. 1 on the Christian rock charts., with the former of the two being certified gold by the RIAA on July 31st 2020. The album debuted at No. 74 on the Billboard 200.

Critical reception

Where Do We Go from Here garnered generally positive reception from seven music critics. At CCM Magazine, David Jenison graded the album an A, writing that the band on the album "ups the ante with songs profoundly richer in attitude and ambition." Haydon Spenceley of Cross Rhythms rated the album an eight out of ten, stating that it is "An album to investigate" At Jesus Freak Hideout, Josh Taylor rated the album four stars, calling the album "definitely worth a listen." Len Nash of The Phantom Tollbooth rated the album three-and-a-half tocks, affirming that the album "picks up ground, and for its total quality, including the first three songs and strong final tracks".

At Christianity Today, Andree Farias rated the album two-and-a-half stars, saying that "While Christian disc jockeys and teens are sure to eat this up, it's uncertain how long the band will be able to make relevant music for those not attuned with Christian rock." Kim Jones of About.com rated the album three stars, stating that the release "had some high spots, some low spots and a few in-betweens." At Allmusic, Johnny Loftus rated the album three stars, writing that "It's another quality effort from Pillar, who probably deserve more exposure, as they can hang sonically with any of their mainstream post-grunge peers."

Track listing

Bonus DVD contains footage of the making of the album, plus photos of the band and other extra features.

Awards and certifications
On 2005, the album was nominated for a Dove Award for Rock Album of the Year at the 36th GMA Dove Awards.
The song "Frontline" was certified gold by the RIAA in July 2020.

References

2004 albums
Pillar (band) albums
Flicker Records albums
Albums produced by Travis Wyrick